Nathan Keith Mauger (born 8 April 1978 in Christchurch, New Zealand) is a rugby union player. He spent the entirety of his Super Rugby career with the Canterbury Crusaders. He played for the All Blacks in 2002 in which he played 2 games but never played a test. He made his debut against Ireland A and played his latest game against Scotland A. His position is centre. He is the brother of All Black, Aaron Mauger. Mauger scored an NPC record 12 tries in the 2001 season for Canterbury.

As well as playing for the Crusaders, Mauger also played for Gloucester in England, Treviso in Italy and Ricoh in France.  Mauger returned to Christchurch, New Zealand, in 2008 where he has started a Rugby Academy.

Nathan briefly coached the Chinese-Taipei sevens team in Taiwan on a 12-week contract from September to December, 2013. He is now an assistant coach with the Sunwolves, a Japan-based side that entered Super Rugby in 2016.

External links

1978 births
Living people
New Zealand rugby union coaches
New Zealand rugby union players
New Zealand sportspeople of Cook Island descent
New Zealand sportspeople of Samoan descent
New Zealand people of French Polynesian descent
New Zealand international rugby union players
Canterbury rugby union players
Crusaders (rugby union) players
Gloucester Rugby players
Sunwolves coaches
Rugby union centres
People educated at Christchurch Boys' High School
Rugby union players from Christchurch
Expatriate rugby union players in England
New Zealand expatriate rugby union players
New Zealand expatriate sportspeople in Japan
New Zealand expatriate sportspeople in England
Bachop-Mauger family